Okříšky is a market town in Třebíč District in the Vysočina Region of the Czech Republic. It has about 2,100 inhabitants.

Notable people
František Konvička (born 1939), basketball player and coach

Twin towns – sister cities

Okříšky is twinned with:
 San Pier d'Isonzo, Italy

References

Populated places in Třebíč District
Market towns in the Czech Republic